Buhler USD 313 is a public unified school district headquartered in Buhler, Kansas, United States.  The district includes the communities of Buhler, northeast Hutchinson, Medora, and nearby rural areas.

Schools
The school district operates the following schools:
 Buhler High School
 Prairie Hills Middle School
 Buhler Grade School
 Plum Creek Elementary School
 Union Valley Elementary School

Closed schools
 Obee Elementary School (K-6) (closed)
 Prosperity Elementary School (4-6) (closed)

See also
 Kansas State Department of Education
 Kansas State High School Activities Association
 List of high schools in Kansas
 List of unified school districts in Kansas

References

External links
 

School districts in Kansas
Education in Reno County, Kansas